The BRM P61 was a Formula One racing car built for the 1963 Formula One season. It was BRM's first attempt at the monocoque design introduced by Lotus a year earlier. Fundamental design issues would mean the car only competed 2 Grands Prix before being garaged in favor of the older, more reliable spaceframe P57. A redesigned monocoque car, dubbed the P261, was introduced for 1964.

Development
After the success of Jim Clark and his Lotus 25 in 1962, BRM began work on their own monocoque car. The P61 was not a true monocoque, a rear subframe was bolted to the front, monocoque half of the car. The subframe housed BRM's type 56 engine, a 1.5 litre V8 and a Colotti gearbox. With approximately 200 horsepower, BRM's V8 rivaled Ferrari for the most powerful engine in F1. BRM's designers, confident in their chassis' rigidity, omitted a rear bulkhead between the driver and engine.

Racing record
The P61's debut came at the French Grand Prix at the hands of champion Graham Hill. Hill stalled at the start and was given a push-start, earning him a 60-second penalty. A lucky Hill would finish the race 3rd, 61 seconds ahead of Jack Brabham. Although the result seemed promising, it immediately became apparent the car suffered from severe chassis flex without a bulkhead. The P61 would not return until Monza, where Hill would retire with clutch problems. Hill's teammate Richie Ginther finished 2nd in the older P57. With no immediate fix to the gearbox and chassis issues, BRM finished out the season with the P57.

Complete Formula One World Championship results

 This total includes points scored by the BRM P57.   All Points scored by the BRM P261

References

BRM Formula One cars